Camaegeria monogama is a moth of the family Sesiidae. It is known from Sierra Leone.

This species is black and the tip of the abdomen has red-orange scales. It is similar to Camaegeria auripicta Strand, 1914, Camaegeria aristura  (Meyrick, 1931) and Camaegeria sophax  (Druce, 1899).

There is the possibility that this species is a junior synonym of Camaegeria exochiformis (Walker, 1856). This species is also native to Sierra Leone and its holotype is in very bad shape.

References
Meyrick, E. 1932a. Exotic Microlepidoptera 4. - — 4(7–11):193–352

Sesiidae
Moths described in 1932
Moths of Africa